"Right Foot Creep" is a song by American rapper YoungBoy Never Broke Again, released on September 11, 2020, as the fourth track from his second studio album, Top. The upbeat trap song sees YoungBoy rapping about YoungBoy's love for firearms, drugs, and murder.

Background
Prior to the song's release, high school footballer Allen Davis created the griddy, a popular dance that went viral following the song's release on the video-sharing app TikTok due to the use of the sound with the dance. Following the rise of the dance and song, several performers such as Ja Morant begun to use the song in their social media posts, boosting the song's publicity.

On April 29, 2021, "Griddy" alongside the song "Right Foot Creep" was added to the famous Epic Games-developed Fortnite.

Charts

Certifications

References

2020 songs
YoungBoy Never Broke Again songs
Songs written by YoungBoy Never Broke Again